Adavibhavi  is a village in the southern state of Karnataka, India. It is located in the Lingsugur taluk of Raichur district in Karnataka.

See also
 Raichur
 Districts of Karnataka

References

External links
 http://Raichur.nic.in/

Villages in Raichur district